Prof. Sheikh Saidul Haque  is a Professor, Indian Politician and was Member of Parliament of the 15th Lok Sabha of India. He represented the Bardhaman-Durgapur constituency of West Bengal and is a member of the Communist Party of India (Marxist) political party.

Haque has also published a book Moulabad and Muslim Janamanas (Fundamentalism and Muslim Mentality).

Early life and education
Saidul Haque was born in village Jagulipara under Galsi I block in Bardhaman district of (West Bengal). He had his schooling from Paraj High School. He completed his education from Burdwan Raj College in Purba Bardhaman district. Haque has B.Ed.  M.A. & D.Litt degrees. He is a professor by profession.

Political career
As a Professor in the Burdwan Raj College, he has been involved with the college and university teachers' movement as a leading figure of the district WEBCUTA (West Bengal College and University Teachers' Association). He has also been a District committee member of the WBDWAA (West Bengal Writers' and Artists' Association), and was involved in organising the progressive cultural movement in the Galsi block. He has also been an integral part of the Literacy campaign in the district. He served as the Vice Chairman of the Galsi-I Panchayat Samiti.
Saidul Haque is the first and incumbent M.P. from Bardhaman-Durgapur constituency; which came into existence from 2009.

Posts Held

See also

15th Lok Sabha
Politics of India
Parliament of India
Government of India
Communist Party of India (Marxist)
Bardhaman-Durgapur

References 

India MPs 2009–2014
1954 births
20th-century Indian Muslims
Communist Party of India (Marxist) politicians from West Bengal
Lok Sabha members from West Bengal
People from Bardhaman
People from Purba Bardhaman district
Living people
Communist Party of India (Marxist) candidates in the 2014 Indian general election